Markus Müller (born 22 May 1988) is a German footballer who plays as a forward for TSV Wachtendonk-Wankum.

Career

Müller began his career with Erzgebirge Aue, and made his debut in the 2. Bundesliga in April 2008, replacing Florian Heller in a 0–0 home draw with 1. FC Kaiserslautern. He left Aue in January 2009 to join Hallescher FC of the Regionalliga Nord, where he spent two and a half seasons, being released in June 2011 after injury had restricted him to just eight appearances in the previous season. He subsequently joined SV Babelsberg 03 of the 3. Liga, for whom he scored 12 goals in the 2011–12 season. After Babelsberg were relegated in the 2012–13 season, he left to sign for Wormatia Worms, where he spent six months before joining Kickers Offenbach.

References

External links

 

1988 births
Living people
German footballers
FC Erzgebirge Aue players
Hallescher FC players
SV Babelsberg 03 players
Wormatia Worms players
Kickers Offenbach players
2. Bundesliga players
3. Liga players
Association football forwards
People from Eberswalde
Footballers from Brandenburg